Manchirevula is a village and panchayat it falls under Rajendranagar mandal in Ranga Reddy district, Telangana, India. Manchirevula village falls within the 10 miles radius of Hyderabad city. Because of its low-lying nature, Manchirevula was flooded in 2022.

Demographics
 India census, Manchirevula had a population of 4459 of which 2,263 are males while 2,196 are females as per report released by Census India 2011. Manchirevula has an average literacy rate of 73.44%, higher than state average of 67.02%. In Manchirevula, male literacy is around 80.92% while female literacy rate is 65.83%. In Manchirevula, 14.96% of the population is under 6 years of age.

References

Villages in Ranga Reddy district